Sébastien Fournier-Bidoz (born 2 April 1976 in Bonneville, Haute-Savoie) is a retired French alpine skier who competed in the 2002 Winter Olympics.

External links
 sports-reference.com

1976 births
Living people
French male alpine skiers
Olympic alpine skiers of France
Alpine skiers at the 2002 Winter Olympics
People from Bonneville, Haute-Savoie
Sportspeople from Haute-Savoie
21st-century French people